Bond of Fear is a 1917 American silent Western film directed by Jack Conway and starring Roy Stewart, Belle Bennett, and Melbourne MacDowell.

Cast
 Roy Stewart as Cal Nelson 
 Belle Bennett as Mary Jackson 
 Melbourne MacDowell as Judge McClure 
 George Webb as John McClure 
 John Lince as Hotel Proprietor

References

Bibliography
 James Robert Parish & Michael R. Pitts. Film directors: a guide to their American films. Scarecrow Press, 1974.

External links
 

1917 films
1917 Western (genre) films
American black-and-white films
1910s English-language films
Films directed by Jack Conway
Silent American Western (genre) films
Triangle Film Corporation films
1910s American films